Crataegus sargentii is a species of hawthorn from the southeastern United States, commonly called Sargent's hawthorn. It is a shrub to about 5 m in height with white flowers, and fruit up to about 1 cm in diameter that are yellow or yellow flushed with pink or red.

References

External links
 '' Sargent Hawthorn, Crataegus sargentii Beadle"  (Floyd County, Northwest Georgia, Southeastern United States)

sargentii
Flora of North America